In enzymology, a secondary-alcohol oxidase is an enzyme that catalyzes the chemical reaction

a secondary alcohol + O2  a ketone + H2O2

Thus, the two substrates of this enzyme are secondary alcohol and O2, whereas its two products are ketone and H2O2.

This enzyme belongs to the family of oxidoreductases, specifically those acting on the CH-OH group of donor with oxygen as acceptor.  The systematic name of this enzyme class is secondary-alcohol:oxygen oxidoreductase. Other names in common use include polyvinyl alcohol oxidase, and secondary alcohol oxidase.

References

 
 
 
 

EC 1.1.3
Enzymes of unknown structure